F. crispa may refer to:
 Ferraria crispa, a flowering plant species
 Freylinia crispa, a shrub species

See also
 Crispa (disambiguation)